Christ of the Sacred Heart is a  statue of Jesus displaying his Sacred Heart located above the town of El Morro, six miles south of the city of Rosarito, Baja California, Mexico.  The statue is situated directly across the highway from the coastal Las Rocas Resort and Spa, from which an excellent view of the statue can be had.

The statue weighs 40 tons and was commissioned by Antonio Pequeno Guerrero.  The head, chest and arms are made of steel and the lower body of fiberglass.  The summit on which it sits used to feature a small cross at which locals used to place flowers on holy days.

See also
List of statues of Jesus
List of tallest statues

References

Baja California
Mountain monuments and memorials
Monuments and memorials in Mexico
Colossal statues of Jesus
Tourist attractions in Baja California
Outdoor sculptures in Mexico